The 2000–01 Slovak Extraliga season was the eighth season of the Slovak Extraliga, the top level of ice hockey in Slovakia. Eight teams participated in the league, and HKM Zvolen won the championship.

Standings

Playoffs

Quarterfinals

 HKM Zvolen - MHC Martin  3:0  (9:2, 6:3, 2:1)
 HC Slovan Bratislava - HK 32 Liptovský Mikuláš  3:0  (5:4 OT, 9:1, 7:3) 
 HK ŠKP Poprad - HC Košice  3:0 (3:2, 4:3, 2:1)
 Dukla Trenčín – HK 36 Skalica  3:2  (2:4, 3:0, 4:2, 0:5, 3:1)

Semifinals 

 HKM Zvolen - HK ŠKP Poprad  3:0  (6:2, 4:2, 3:0)
 HC Slovan Bratislava - Dukla Trenčín  2:3  (6:1, 3:4, 2:3 OT, 5:2, 2:3 OT)

Final 
 HKM Zvolen - Dukla Trenčín  3:1  (6:0, 3:1, 1:2, 6:3)

External links
 Slovak Ice Hockey Federation

Slovak Extraliga seasons
2000–01 in European ice hockey leagues
Liga